Rubén Díez Adán (born 18 August 1993), sometimes known as Jamelli, is a Spanish professional footballer who plays for Deportivo de La Coruña. Mainly a central midfielder, he can also play as an attacking midfielder.

Club career
Born in Zaragoza, Aragon, Díez finished his formation with AD Stadium Casablanca, and made his debut as a senior with CD Valdefierro during the 2012–13 season, in Tercera División. On 29 June 2013, he moved to SD Huesca and was assigned to the farm team also in the fourth tier.

Díez first arrived in Segunda División B in July 2018 with CD Teruel, after representing fourth division sides CD Ebro, Deportivo Aragón and SD Tarazona. On 21 January 2019, he moved to fellow league team CD Castellón.

On 6 March 2020, Díez renewed his contract with the Orelluts until 2022, and contributed with six goals in 29 appearances during the campaign as his side achieved promotion to Segunda División.

On 12 September 2020, aged 27, Díez made his professional debut by starting in a 2–1 away win against SD Ponferradina. He scored his first professional goal fourteen days later, netting the opener in a 1–1 away draw against UD Logroñés.

On 16 August 2021, after the Orelluts relegation, Díez signed a four-year contract with CD Tenerife also in the second division. On 3 August of the following year, he moved to Primera Federación side Deportivo de La Coruña on a one-year loan deal.

References

External links

1990 births
Living people
Footballers from Zaragoza
Spanish footballers
Association football midfielders
Segunda División players
Primera Federación players
Segunda División B players
Tercera División players
AD Almudévar players
CD Ebro players
Real Zaragoza B players
SD Tarazona footballers
CD Teruel footballers
CD Castellón footballers
CD Tenerife players
Deportivo de La Coruña players